Roger Federer and Max Mirnyi were the defending champions but lost in the final 7–6(7–4), 6–2 against Wayne Arthurs and Paul Hanley.

Seeds
Champion seeds are indicated in bold text while text in italics indicates the round in which those seeds were eliminated.

 Jonas Björkman /  Todd Woodbridge (semifinals)
 Martin Damm /  Cyril Suk (semifinals)
 Donald Johnson /  Jared Palmer (first round)
 Wayne Black /  Kevin Ullyett (first round)

Draw

External links
 2003 ABN AMRO World Tennis Tournament Doubles draw

2003 ABN AMRO World Tennis Tournament
Doubles